The Chinese Ambassador to Italy is the official representative of the People's Republic of China to Italy.

List of representatives

See also
China–Italy relations

References 

Ambassadors of China to Italy
Italy
China